Forest Lawn Memorial Park, also known as Forest Lawn Cemetery, is located at 7909 Mormon Bridge Road in North Omaha, Nebraska. It was established in 1885 when the mutual Forest Lawn Cemetery Association was donated  in northwest of the city. In 1886, the first interment in the cemetery was the donor of the land, John H. Brackin. Forest Lawn is Omaha's largest cemetery and the burial location of many of Omaha's second generation of leadership.

History

Before Forest Lawn Cemetery was founded, the northwest corner of the property was used as a Potter's Field for poor people and people whose identities were not known. It was used from at least the 1880s through the 1960s.

Historic Omaha family names are scattered throughout the cemetery, along with veterans from the Civil, Spanish–American, and World Wars I and II, as well as Korea, Vietnam, Gulf and Iraq Wars.

The G.A.R., the Freemasons, and the Omaha Typographical Union owned parts of Forest Lawn Cemetery, and part of Forest Lawn was made into a national soldiers' cemetery. Income from the land, as it is sold, continues to be used for protecting, preserving, and embellishing the cemetery.

Soon after Forest Lawn was opened, Omaha's pioneer burying place, Prospect Hill Cemetery, stopped being used. Shortly thereafter Prospect Hill's owner, Byron Reed, sold it to Forest Lawn in the 1890s. That Cemetery soon fell into disrepair, and was only redeemed in the 1980s.

Notable interments
 Howard Malcolm Baldrige, U.S. Secretary of Commerce
 Kimera Bartee, baseball player and coach
 Joseph Stillman Blake, architect with Blake & Zander
 James E. Boyd, Mayor of Omaha, Governor of Nebraska
 Norris Brown
 Howard Homan Buffett, father of Warren Buffett
 Hugh Alfred Butler
 Caroline Augusta Clowry (G. Estabrook), first American woman to publish an opera
 Harry Buffington Coffee
 Tom Dennison, Omaha political boss
 Richard A. Dier, judge
 Henry Doorly, publisher of Omaha World-Herald
 Experience Estabrook
 J.E. Goodson, 19th century musician
 Gilbert Hitchcock, U.S. Senator and founder of Omaha World-Herald
 Robert Beecher Howell
 Albert Webb Jefferis
 David Knox, Civil War photographer
 Herman Kountze
 Jesse Lowe, first mayor of Omaha
 Charles Frederick Manderson
 David Henry Mercer
 Jarvis Offutt, World War I aviator, namesake of Offutt Air Force Base
 Anne Ramsey, actress
 Samuel Williams Reynolds
 Alvin Saunders
 Walter Scott Jr.

See also
 History of Omaha
 List of cemeteries in Omaha

References

External links
 Forest Lawn Memorial Park
 
 Name database
 Map of Forest Lawn
 

Cemeteries in Omaha, Nebraska
History of Omaha, Nebraska
Historic American Landscapes Survey in Nebraska
1885 establishments in Nebraska